The Constitution of the Commonwealth of Massachusetts is the fundamental governing document of the Commonwealth of Massachusetts, one of the 50 individual state governments that make up the United States of America. As a member of the Massachusetts Constitutional Convention of 1779, John Adams was the document's principal author. Voters approved the document on June 15, 1780. It became effective on October 25, 1780, and is among the oldest functioning written constitutions in continuous effect in the world. Only the Constitution of San Marino and the Magna Carta have sections still in force that are older. It was also the first constitution anywhere to be created by a convention called for that purpose rather than by a legislative body.

The Massachusetts Constitution was written last of the original states' first constitutions. Rather than taking the form of a list of provisions, it was organized into a structure of chapters, sections and articles. It served as a model for the Constitution of the United States of America, drafted seven years later, which used a similar structure. It also influenced later revisions of many other state constitutions. The Massachusetts Constitution has four parts: a preamble, a declaration of rights, a description of the framework of government, and articles of amendment.

It has been amended 121 times, most recently in 2022.

History
In the spring of 1775, Adams took the position that each state should call a special convention to write a constitution and then submit it to a popular vote. He told the Continental Congress that:

The legislative body of Massachusetts, known as the Massachusetts General Court, instead drafted its own version of a constitution and submitted it to the voters, who rejected it in 1778. That version did not provide for the separation of powers, nor did it include a statement of individual rights. The General Court then organized the election of delegates from each town to participate in a convention that would draft a constitution and submit their work to a popular vote with the understanding that its adoption would require approval by two-thirds of the voters. The constitutional convention met in Cambridge in September 1779.

The convention sat from September 1 to October 30, 1779. Its 312 members chose a committee of thirty members to prepare a new constitution and declaration of rights. That committee asked Adams to draft a declaration of rights. It appointed a subcommittee of James Bowdoin, Samuel Adams, and John Adams to draft the constitution and that trio delegated the drafting to John Adams alone. He later wrote that he constituted a "sub-sub committee of one". An article on religion was referred to members of the clergy, which resulted in a form of religious establishment entirely unlike that later adopted at the federal level. Adams advocated for an end to that establishment when revisions to the constitution were considered in 1820 and his views were adopted in 1832.

Adams's draft declaration of rights read in part: "All men are born equally free and independent..." Before being adopted by the constitutional convention it was revised to read: "All men are born free and equal..." At the insistence of Adams, the document referred to the state as a "commonwealth."

Male voters 21 years or older ratified the constitution and declaration of rights at the convention on June 15, 1780, and it became effective on October 25, 1780.

Preamble
The preamble of the constitution provided a model that was drawn on when the United States Constitution was composed a few years later, including  some phrases near the end. It reads:

Declaration of Rights
"Part the First: A Declaration of the Rights of the Inhabitants of the Commonwealth of Massachusetts" consists of thirty articles. The first states:

This article was the subject of a landmark case in 1781 before a Massachusetts court sitting in Great Barrington, Brom and Bett v. Ashley. Elizabeth Freeman (whose slave name was "Bett"), a black slave owned by Colonel John Ashley, sued for her freedom based on this article. The jury agreed that slavery was inconsistent with the Massachusetts Constitution and awarded Freeman £5 in damages and her freedom. A few years later, Quock Walker, a black slave, sued his master for false imprisonment; the jury found for Walker and awarded him damages of £50. His master was then subject to criminal prosecution for assault and battery against Walker and was found guilty by a jury, which imposed a fine of 40/- (£2). In this manner, slavery lost any legal protection in Massachusetts, making it a tortious act under the law, effectively abolishing it within the Commonwealth.

In 1976 by amendment Article CVI, this article was amended to change the word "men" to "people". That amendment also added an additional sentence: “Equality under the law shall not be denied or abridged because of sex, race, color, creed or national origin.”

This article was also the basis for the 2003 Supreme Judicial Court's ruling in Goodridge v. Department of Public Health required the Commonwealth to extend marriage rights to same-sex couples on an equal basis with different-sex couples.

The next several Articles within the "Part the First" in the original 1780 Constitution of Massachusetts called upon the people of the Commonwealth as being their "right as well as the duty of all men" (Article II) to a strong religious conviction and belief.

Article III continued by noting that "the happiness of a people" and "preservation of civil government" is explicitly tied to religion and morality. This article established the possibility of "town religions" by allowing the state legislature, though Massachusetts cannot declare or recognize a state religion, to require towns to pay for the upkeep of a Protestant church out of local tax funds, with the town to determine by majority vote the denomination it would support as its parish church.

From 1780 to 1824 these democratically selected parish churches were considered the only churches with full legal rights, as "voluntary" churches ran against the Federalist ideal of a commonwealth. Until 1822 all residents of a town were required to belong to the parish church. In that year they were allowed to attend a neighboring town's church instead, and in 1824 full religious freedom was granted. However, the parishes remained beneficiaries of local taxes and were unable to expel dissident parishioners, since as residents they were members of the parish until they declared otherwise. Soon both dissident churches and the majority Congregational Church increasingly recognized that this system was contrary to the voluntary nature of religious worship. This section of the constitution was amended by bipartisan consensus in 1834 at the same time that several blue laws were repealed.

Frame of Government

Part II, Chapter I, Section I

The opening of the "Part the Second" lays down the official name of the State of Massachusetts.

The first three articles in Chapter I, Section I,of the Massachusetts Constitution establishes the three primary branches of government; an executive, a bicameral legislature, and an independent judiciary. The design of this system, unique at the time, was created to ensure the proper separation of power between the different entities. The framers of the state constitution intended by this means to prevent the abuse of power by any one branch.

Removal – impeachment

Massachusetts allows impeachment of government officials through the Legislature. They can also disqualify convicted officials from ever holding any place within the commonwealth.

Articles of Amendment
There are 121 Articles of Amendment that have been added to the Massachusetts Constitution. The most recent one places a 4% marginal tax on income over $1,000,000 and was approved by a vote of 52% to 48% in 2022.

The amendment process is governed by the 48th Article of Amendment to the Constitution, which establishes an indirect initiative process that requires action by the state legislature, followed by a referendum.

For an amendment to be placed before the voters as a referendum, a state constitutional convention, a joint meeting of both houses of the legislature sitting as one body, in each of two successive two-year legislative sessions, must provide the required number of votes, which varies according to how the proposed amendment comes before the convention.

If it is a legislative amendment proposed by a legislator, the threshold is 50% of the members. If it is an initiative amendment put forward by petition, the threshold is 25% of the members. In both cases, the calculation of the votes is based on the number of seats in the constitutional convention, not the members present or seated.

The number of certified signatures required on the petitions is 3% of the total vote cast for all candidates for governor (excluding blanks) at the immediately preceding state election.<ref>Massachusetts Legislature: Article XLVIII, accessed July 5, 2013</ref>

Constitutional conventions
The state has held four constitutional conventions of elected delegates (as opposed to those that are special sessions of the legislature):

Massachusetts Constitutional Convention of 1779–1780, drew up the original document
Massachusetts Constitutional Convention of 1820–1821, submitted a number of articles to a popular vote, resulting in the adoption of the first nine amendments and the rejection of a number of other proposals
Massachusetts Constitutional Convention of 1853
Massachusetts Constitutional Convention of 1917–1918

See also

 Mayflower Compact (1620)
 Massachusetts Charter
 Charter of the Massachusetts Bay Company
 Initiative petition, the Bay State's specific legal term for a public method for Massachusetts residents to affect Constitutional law, for example, Proposition 2½ 
 Massachusetts Body of Liberties (1641)
 Instrument of Government (1653)
 Law of Massachusetts
 State constitution (United States)
 Unenrolled voter: within Massachusetts, one who is registered to vote, but with no'' declared party affiliation.

References

External links

Constitution of the Commonwealth of Massachusetts (Full Text)
Constitution of the Commonwealth of Massachusetts, 1780 printed edition, appending an address given by convention president James Bowdoin

1779 documents
1779 in Massachusetts
1780 establishments in Massachusetts
1780 in law
Constitution
Constitition
Constitution
Constitution
Massachusetts